Frankenstein is a fictional DC Comics character based on the Frankenstein's monster character created by Mary Shelley.

Publication history
Frankenstein, obviously based upon Mary Shelley's famous character from the novel Frankenstein; or, the Modern Prometheus (1818), was created in 1948 by Edmond Hamilton and Bob Kane in Detective Comics #135.

A later reworking was developed by Len Wein as the Spawn of Frankenstein concept. The monster fell under the thrall of Count Dracula. They often battled against Superman, Batman, or the Phantom Stranger. He appeared in The Phantom Stranger (vol. 2) #23-30 (February 1973-May 1974), Action Comics #531 (May 1982), and The Young All-Stars #18-19 (November–December 1988).

A third Frankenstein Monster appears in Superman #344 (February 1980), along with Count Dracula. These both come from "The World of Nightmare" and battle Superman, the Phantom Stranger, and Cassandra Craft.

Frankenstein's latest revamping was created by Grant Morrison and Doug Mahnke in 2005 and is similar to Doc Frankenstein. He is one of the Seven Soldiers, and bears a resemblance to the creature as portrayed by Boris Karloff in the 1931 film directed by James Whale.

Fictional character biography
Frankenstein is an undead body composed of parts from several corpses stitched together, created by Victor Frankenstein some time in the 19th century. He was assumed dead in the Arctic when he sank beneath the ice, but he survived and swam to America, having 'many adventures'. He was revived by Victor Adam. He vowed vengeance against Adam for restoring him to life, successfully killing him, but accidentally bringing about a coma for Doctor Thirteen's wife, Maria, in the process. In particular, Frankenstein became a frequent enemy of Melmoth, whom he referred to as the Ringmaster of the Circus of Maggots. In a climactic battle in 1870, Frankenstein faced Melmoth and stopped him from destroying a town with maggot-hominids. The fight took place on a moving train, which was derailed during the conflict, and Frankenstein's fate was unknown.

In 2005, a high school student, called 'Uglyhead' by all the other children, acquires telepathic abilities through contact with the Sheeda, which he uses to torment his peers. At the senior prom, the now-docile students are killed by the Sheeda maggot-hominids. This causes the return of Frankenstein, who had survived in a state of hibernation underneath the town, who makes short work of the maggot-hominids and the boy, before burning down the school to cover the bodies. Afterwards, Frankenstein tracks down Melmoth and makes his way to Mars through an "Erdel Gate" (a reference to Dr. Saul Erdel, the scientist who first transported the Martian Manhunter to Earth). On Mars, Frankenstein confronts Melmoth once again. Frankenstein frees the children Melmoth has enslaved to work in his gold mines, and feeds Melmoth to the flesh-eating, praying mantis-like horses of Mars. Before he is consumed, Melmoth reveals that it was not lightning that brought the monster to life, but several drops of his own immortal blood, sold to Frankenstein's creator, that still course through Frankenstein's veins.

In the third issue of the series, Frankenstein meets an old acquaintance greatly resembling the "Bride" in James Whale's film Bride of Frankenstein, albeit with two extra arms grafted onto her by the Red Swami, a supervillain who brainwashed her into thinking she was the reincarnation of an assassin goddess. She is now an agent of the Super Human Advanced Defense Executive (S.H.A.D.E.), a secret government agency, which temporarily drafts Frankenstein as well. Of their previous relationship, she says: "It's nothing personal, but you were never my type".

In the final issue, he stows away on a time-ship which brings him to the Sheeda realm in the distant future. There, he destroys their world-destroying fleet, kills the Sheeda-Queen's time-yacht's steersman, and hijacks her ship to the present. Once in the present, though, Klarion the Witch Boy gains control of Frankenstein using a witch-brand and forces him to take the castle back to the future.

He appears briefly in Infinite Crisis #7, which takes place one week after the Frankenstein miniseries. He is seen fighting against General Wade Eiling. Frankenstein is armed with a three-foot-long sword, which he claims once belonged to the Archangel Michael, and a large antique pistol, which he calls his 'steam-gun'.

A character called Young Frankenstein has appeared in Teen Titans as a member of the team during the "Lost Year" covered by 52. Young Frankenstein is apparently killed by Black Adam during World War III, but actually survives.

Frankenstein and S.H.A.D.E appear in Final Crisis #3, also written by Grant Morrison. He again appears two issues later, leading a squad of superheroes against Darkseid's forces, who are led by Kalibak. He is also seen in the final issue fighting in humanity's last stand before Superman gets the Miracle Machine working. Frankenstein is immune to Darkseid's weapon, the Anti-Life Equation, because he is already dead.

Frankenstein confronts Solomon Grundy in the latter's current limited series, and again during the Blackest Night. Grundy, having been transformed into a Black Lantern, rips out Frankenstein's heart. Due to having an extra one in his chest, Frankenstein survives this attack.

A version of the character appears in a spinoff of the 2011 alternate-timeline crossover event Flashpoint (comics).  The three-issue series was titled Flashpoint: Frankenstein & the Creatures of the Unknown.

As part of The New 52 (a 2011 reboot of the DC Comics universe), a new ongoing series Frankenstein, Agent of S.H.A.D.E. was released, based on the Seven Soldiers version of Frankenstein. It was initially written by Jeff Lemire and drawn by Alberto Ponticelli. Matt Kindt replaced Lemire with issue #10 and stayed with the book until it was cancelled with issue #16. The character later joins the Justice League Dark.

The character appears next in seven issues of both the New 52 Batman and Robin and the DC Rebirth Superman, both written by Peter Tomasi and drawn by Patrick Gleason. Later in 2018, the Seven Soldiers briefly reunite in Sideways, then in 2019 Frankenstein forms a team of fellow monsters to once again stop Melmoth in Gotham City Monsters.

Powers and abilities
Frankenstein is undead, composed of assorted body parts taken from dozens of different sources.

Frankenstein has superhuman strength, does not need to eat or sleep, and is functionally immortal. He has mental access to the S.H.A.D.E. database via a surgical implant.

Because of his undead nature, Frankenstein can replace damaged or missing limbs with grafts taken from individuals of similar build and adapt it to his unique physiology.

Other versions
A variation of Frankenstein comes from Earth-276 and is a member of the Monster League of Evil alongside Count Dracula, the Wolf-Man, and the Mummy.

In the alternate timeline of the Flashpoint event, Frankenstein was awakened during World War II and attacks Nazi soldiers to save Lt. Matthew Shrieve. Later, Frankenstein is invited by Project M to join the Creature Commandos. Leading a raid with the Creature Commandos, Frankenstein personally killed Adolf Hitler. After the end of World War II, however, Project M was deemed obsolete by Robert Crane's government services. Frankenstein refuses to accept, but is subdued and put into stasis by the G. I. Robot. Later, Frankenstein and the Creature Commandos revive, escape from their prison and discover they have been awakened over 65 years later. Frankenstein and the Creature Commandos travel to Gotham City, where Dr. Mazursky might live and believe him to be alive. The Creature Commandos found Dr. Mazursky's cabin; they discover that Dr. Mazursky has moved to Romania, when the Creature Commandos are ultimately ambushed by Matthew Shrieve's granddaughter Miranda and a group of soldiers. Frankenstein attacks the soldiers, but he was sprung by the G. I. Robot to be subdued again. The Creature Commandos saved Frankenstein by tearing the G. I. Robot apart. During the attacks, the Creature Commandos are saved by Frankenstein's Bride, who is revealed to be alive. The Bride explains to her husband that she is working as an agent of S.H.A.D.E. Later, Frankenstein and the Creature Commandos then travel to Romania with Miranda, who was being manipulated by General Sam Lane, who is revealed to be the one truly responsible for the deaths of Miranda's family. They arrive in Romania, where they found a small village populated by monsters. The village is then attacked by a giant G. I. Robot. After they destroy the G. I. Robot, Frankenstein, the Bride and Miranda depart from the Creature Commandos and participate in the Atlantean/Amazon war.

In other media

Television
 Frankenstein appears in The World's Greatest SuperFriends episode "The Super Friends Meet Frankenstein". This version was created by Dr. Frankenstein, descendant of Dr. Victor Frankenstein.
 Frankenstein appears in Teen Titans Go!.
 Eric Frankenstein will appear in the HBO Max / DC Universe DCEU animated miniseries Creature Commandos as the member of the titular team.

Video games
 Frankenstein appears as a playable character in Lego Batman 3: Beyond Gotham, voiced by Fred Tatasciore.
 Frankenstein appears as an unlockable playable character in Lego DC Super-Villains.

Collected editions

References

External links
 Frankenstein at Comic Vine
 Spawn of Frankenstein at the DCU Guide
 Frankenstein at the DCU Guide Wiki
 Seven Soldiers: Frankenstein annotations at Barbelith
 

Characters created by Bob Kane
1946 comics debuts
Horror comics
DC Comics male superheroes
Characters created by Edmond Hamilton
Comics characters introduced in 1948
Comics characters introduced in 2006
DC Comics characters with superhuman strength
Fictional monsters
DC Comics undead characters
Comics based on Frankenstein